Han Peixin (October 1921—15 January 2017) was a People's Republic of China politician. He was born in Xiangshui County, Jiangsu Province. In the 1980s he served as Chinese Communist Party Committee Secretary and Governor of his home province. He was a member of the 12th and 13th Central Committees of the Chinese Communist Party. He was a delegate to the 5th (1978–1983), 6th (1983–1988) and 7th National People's Congress (1988–1993).

Han died in Nanjing on 15 January 2017.

References

1921 births
2017 deaths
People's Republic of China politicians from Jiangsu
Chinese Communist Party politicians from Jiangsu
Governors of Jiangsu
Delegates to the 5th National People's Congress
Delegates to the 6th National People's Congress
Delegates to the 7th National People's Congress
Members of the Standing Committee of the 8th Chinese People's Political Consultative Conference